Calliostoma aikeni is a species of sea snail, a marine gastropod mollusk, in the family Calliostomatidae within the superfamily Trochoidea, the top snails, turban snails and their allies.

Distribution
This species occurs in KwaZulu-Natal.

References

Endemic fauna of South Africa
aikeni